Fireworks City is the second and final album by the rock/reggae influenced UK band Audioweb. It was produced by Steve Lironi and released in 1998 via Mother Records.

Track listing
"Policeman Skank... (The Story Of My Life)"
"Test The Theory"
"Personal Feeling"
"Try"
"Sentiments For A Reason"
"Soul On Fire"
"Freefall"
"Out Of Many"
"Control"
"Out Of My Mind"
"Get out of Here"

References

Audioweb albums
1998 albums